Mark Payne may refer to:

 Mark Payne (make-up artist) (born 1965), makeup artist, filmmaker and author
 Mark Payne (footballer) (born 1960), English former footballer
 Mark Payne (basketball) (born 1988), American basketball player